The Fallen is a 1926 German silent drama film directed by Rudolf Walther-Fein and Rudolf Dworsky and starring Asta Nielsen, William Dieterle, and Otto Gebühr. The film's art direction was by Jacek Rotmil. It addressed the issue of alcoholism amongst the German working class.

Cast

References

Bibliography

External links
 

1926 films
Films of the Weimar Republic
1926 drama films
German silent feature films
German drama films
Films directed by Rudolf Walther-Fein
Films directed by Rudolf Dworsky
Films based on German novels
Films about alcoholism
German black-and-white films
Silent drama films
1920s German films
1920s German-language films